The 2016 Ivy League men's soccer season was the 62nd season of men's varsity soccer in the conference.

The Dartmouth Big Green are the defending champions, by virtue of winning the regular season (there is no conference tournament).

Changes from 2015 

 None

Teams

Stadiums and locations

Regular season

Results

Rankings

Postseason

NCAA tournament

All-Ivy League awards and teams

First team

Second team

Third team

See also 
 2016 NCAA Division I men's soccer season
 2016 Ivy League women's soccer season

References 

 
2016 NCAA Division I men's soccer season